Paul Antony-Barber is an English actor. He is best known for his role as Principal Sweet, in the early 2010s mystery/drama/comedy show House of Anubis. He worked alongside Francis Magee and Burkely Duffield in the show as well.

Career
Boyd van Hoeij of The Hollywood Reporter described his performance in A Dark Reflection as "played with scenery-chewing gusto", and Lloyd Evans of The Spectator called his performance as a juror in a stage production of Twelve Angry Men "a brilliant turn".

Personal life
Barber married actress Glynis Barber in 1976; the couple divorced in 1979.

Filmography

Film

Television

References

External links

Living people
20th-century births
British male film actors
Male actors from London
20th-century British male actors
21st-century British male actors
British male television actors